HMS Rapid was a Satellite-class composite screw sloop of the Royal Navy, built at Devonport Dockyard and launched on 21 March 1883. She was later reclassified as a corvette.

Initially on service with the Cape of Good Hope and West Africa Station, Rapid commenced service on the Australia Station in 1886. She was recommissioned three times in Sydney before leaving the Australia Station on 1 December 1897. In March 1902, it was announced that she would be sold out of service owing to defects in her machinery. Six months later, she was instead posted to Gibraltar where she arrived for dockyard work in September 1902. Hulked in 1906, she was converted into a coal hulk in 1912 and was renamed C7.  She became an accommodation ship in 1916 and was renamed Hart. She was sold at Gibraltar in 1948.

Notes

References
Bastock, John (1988), Ships on the Australia Station, Child & Associates Publishing Pty Ltd; Frenchs Forest, Australia. 

1883 ships
Ships built in Plymouth, Devon
Satellite-class sloops
Victorian-era sloops of the United Kingdom